Monomorine I is a bicyclic amine that is the trail pheromone of Monomorium pharaonis. Its structure was first elucidated 1973. Synthetic monomorine might be used to lure ants to their doom.

References 

Indolizidines
Pheromones